Rotation operator may refer to:
 An operator that specifies a rotation (mathematics)
 Three-dimensional rotation operator
 Rot (operator) aka Curl, a differential operator in mathematics
 Rotation operator (quantum mechanics)